The 1995 Marshall Thundering Herd football team represented Marshall University as a member of the Southern Conference (SoCon) during the 1995 NCAA Division I-AA football season. Led by sixth-year head coach Jim Donnan, the Thundering Herd compiled an overall record of 12–3 with a mark of 7–1 in conference play, placing second in the SoCon. Marshall advanced to the NCAA  Division I-AA Championship playoffs for the fifth straight season, where they defeated  in the first round,  in the quarterfinals, and McNeese State in the semifinals, before losing to Montana in the NCAA Division I-AA Championship Game. Marshall played home games at Marshall University Stadium in Huntington, West Virginia.

Regular season
Marshall was quarterbacked by true freshman and future NFL starter Chad Pennington. Starting running back Chris Parker set the Marshall single season rushing record with 1,833 rushing yards.

Postseason
Marshall advanced to the 1995 NCAA I-AA playoffs with an at large bid, but held home field advantage for the first two games, defeating Jackson State and Northern Iowa in Huntington before going on the road against McNeese State in the semifinal game. Marshall defeated McNeese State and advanced to the I-AA National Championship game, which was held at Marshall's stadium against the Montana Grizzlies. This was the fourth consecutive I-AA National Championship game hosted by Marshall. Marshall lost the championship game, 22–20.

Schedule

References

Marshall
Marshall Thundering Herd football seasons
Marshall Thundering Herd football